The Scout X-2B was an American expendable launch system which was flown during 1963. It was a four-stage rocket, based on the earlier Scout X-2, but with an Altair 2A fourth stage in place of the Altair 1A used on the X-2. It was a member of the Scout family of rockets.

The Scout X-2 was an all-solid rocket, with an Algol 1D first stagea Castor 1A second stage, an Antares 2A third stage, and an Altair 2A fourth stage. It made only one flight, which was launched from Launch Complex D at Point Arguello, carrying a P-35 weather satellites, P35-5. The launch occurred on 27 September 1963, and failed to achieve orbit.

References

 

1963 in spaceflight
X-2B